Kila is a census-designated place and unincorporated community in Flathead County, Montana, United States. Its population was 392 as of the 2010 census. Kila has a post office with ZIP code 59920, which opened on May 27, 1901. The community is located along U.S. Route 2, 10 miles from Kalispell.

Originally called Sedan by the Great Northern Railway when homesteaders settled the area in 1892, the name was changed after William Kiley when Kiley filed for a post office in 1901. The town was platted in 1914.

Demographics

Climate
This climatic region is typified by large seasonal temperature differences, with warm to hot (and often humid) summers and cold (sometimes severely cold) winters.  According to the Köppen Climate Classification system, Kila has a humid continental climate, abbreviated "Dfb" on climate maps.

Education
The Kila School District educates students in the area.

References

Census-designated places in Flathead County, Montana
Census-designated places in Montana
Unincorporated communities in Montana
Unincorporated communities in Flathead County, Montana